Minsara Kanna is a 1999 Indian Tamil-language romantic comedy film written and directed by K. S. Ravikumar. The film stars Vijay, Monica Castelino, Khushbu and Rambha, while an ensemble supporting cast includes Manivannan, Mansoor Ali Khan, R. Sundarrajan, Karan and Kovai Sarala. The film's title was derived from the song of the same name in Padayappa, which was also directed by Ravikumar. The film saw Vijay and Rambha sharing the screen together for the third and final time after Ninaithen Vandhai (1998) and Endrendrum Kadhal (1999).

Kushboo appeared as one of the main lead actress of the film. The story is about how Vijay enters her house and developing his romance towards Monica, Kushboo's sister. The music is composed by Deva. The film released on 9 September 1999 and became an commercial success at the box office.

Plot 
The story is about a wealthy business tycoon, Indra Devi, who has a troubled past. She lives alone in a huge mansion with her assistant. She has no male staff because she has an extreme dislike for the opposite sex. One day, Kannan goes to Indra Devi's house to take refuge to escape the cops. There he finds Indra Devi and her assistant being harassed by goons. He fights the goons and chases them away. After a few weeks, Indra Devi's younger sister, Ishwarya, comes to Ooty to pursue her studies. There she meets Kannan, and the two are at odds from their very first meeting. In a series of comic events, they both try to undermine the other in the household while Kannan's popularity increases among the staff. Indra Devi strictly opposes Ishwarya's relationship with men explaining her difficult past life to her, and hopes that her sister never marries just like her. Once Kannan makes a place in Ishwaryas life, he brings his family to Ooty to meet the love of his life. To get a place to live for a few days, Kannan and his family stay in Indra Devi's house disguised as a cook, cleaners, drivers, gardens, etc. It later comes to light that Kannan is a billionaire based in Germany, and he is Ishwarya's lover. The two, along with Kannan's family, had arrived in India to convince Indira Devi that not all men are evil. When Indra Devi discovers this, she mistakes Kannan and his family for con men trying to use her sister to become rich. She attempts to marry her sister off to a suitor of her choice and has Kannan, his father, and his brother beaten up. As Ishwarya tries to leave with them, Devi threatens to commit suicide. Kannan and his family leave and return to Germany, telling Indira Devi that they'd rather forget their love and live with its memories than have Ishwarya spend the rest of her life mourning her dead sister. As the family arrives home, they find Indira Devi and Ishwarya waiting for them there, indicating that the former has accepted Kannan.

Cast

Production
Following the success of Padayappa (1999), producer K. R. Gangadharan signed on K. S. Ravikumar to direct a film and was insistent that the title should be Minsara Kanna, after the popular song from Ravikumar's earlier film. The story and script of the film was then  subsequently worked on by Ravikumar and co-written by M. A. Kennedy, who had previously worked in the film Pistha. The film was launched at the Kavithalaya Studio, with Rajinikanth, Vijay, Ravikumar and K. Balachandar attending the inaugural event and the filming began in April 1999. The film saw the first and only collaboration to date between K. S. Ravikumar and Vijay, with the actor mentioning he was delighted with the pace and commitment that the director injected into production.

It was initially reported that Vijay would play a dual role but this proved to be untrue. For the female lead role, Simran was approached by Vijay, but the actress refused the offer due to the role has not much importance than the second lead and the antagonist which is played by Khushbu. Priya Gill was approached before debutant Monica Castelino got the opportunity to feature. Furthermore, Roja was supposed to play the second lead in the film before Rambha was confirmed. Actress Bhawana was signed on to play Vijay's sister in the film.

Shooting took place in and around Ooty, ECR area in Chennai and some scenes were shot predominantly in Germany where other few scenes were shot in Interlaken which is located in Switzerland, with two songs being canned in the Alps area.

Soundtrack

The soundtrack of the film was composed by Deva, was well received by the audience. The lyrics were written by Vaali, Kalaikumar, Na. Muthukumar.

Release

The film released on 9 September 1999. The critic of Indolink.com claimed the film "jogs along easily before becoming enmeshed in sentiments and cinematic cliches which make the last part of the movie all but watchable". The New Indian Express criticised Vijay's performance claiming "greatest actor", and that "film drags on aimlessly" though praised Deva's soundtrack. Deccan Herald also gave the film a negative review labelling that Vijay "is painful to watch and even worse to listen to", labelling it is "an exercise in how to waste a good movie". Ananda Vikatan rated the film 37 out of 100.

Post-release, the film garnered attention after video recording equipment was found at Suriyan Theatre in Chennai which had been showing the film. The equipment was found out to be a unit of a group known as Saravanas Video, who had been hired by a TV production company owned by director K. Balachander. Vijay's father S. Chandrasekhar intervened, seized the equipment and alleged that Balachander was potentially involved in piracy activities. Balachander subsequently stepped down as president from the trade union body FEFSI, complaining that he was being harassed by Chandrasekhar. As a result, members of the film industry threatened to ban Vijay and Chandrasekhar from working on Tamil films. During the unofficial ban, actor Ajith Kumar notably spoke out in favour of Vijay. The parties later reconciled and Balachander withdrew his resignation.

In February 2020, producer P. L. Thenappan, who had bought the film's rights from K. R. Gangadharan, announced plans to sue the makers of the Korean film Parasite for plagiarism.

References

External links
 

1999 films
1990s Tamil-language films
Films scored by Deva (composer)
Films directed by K. S. Ravikumar
Films shot in Switzerland
Films shot in Germany